
Gmina Wymiarki is a rural gmina (administrative district) in Żagań County, Lubusz Voivodeship, in western Poland.

Villages
Gmina Wymiarki contains the villages and settlements of Lubartów, Lubieszów, Lutynka, Silno Małe, Witoszyn and Wymiarki.

Neighbouring gminas
Gmina Wymiarki is bordered by the gminas of Iłowa, Przewóz and Żary.

Twin towns – sister cities

Gmina Wymiarki is twinned with:
 Kreba-Neudorf, Germany

References

Wymiarki
Żagań County